About My Father is an upcoming American comedy film directed by Laura Terruso from a screenplay by Sebastian Maniscalco and Austen Earl. The film stars Maniscalco and is loosely based on his life and his relationship with his father, played by Robert De Niro. Leslie Bibb, Anders Holm, David Rasche, and Kim Cattrall co-star in supporting roles.

It is set to be released by Lionsgate on May 26, 2023.

Plot
Sebastian informs his traditional Italian immigrant father Salvo about his plan to propose to his American girlfriend, and Salvo insists on joining them for a weekend with her parents. Despite the clash between their two cultures and initial perception of having nothing in common, they eventually become a single, unified family by the end of the summer holiday weekend.

Cast
 Sebastian Maniscalco as himself
 Robert De Niro as Salvo Maniscalco
 Leslie Bibb as Ellie
 Anders Holm as Lucky Collins
 David Rasche as Bill
 Kim Cattrall as Tigger
 Brett Dier as Doug Collins

Production
On April 26, 2018, it was announced that Sebastian Maniscalco was set to star in an untitled film inspired by his life for Lionsgate, with Austen Earl attached to co-write the screenplay alongside Maniscalco. There were no further developments until May 12, 2021, when it was announced that Laura Terruso was set to direct the film and Robert de Niro was cast in a lead role. American Pies Chris and Paul Weitz were attached to produce the film alongside Andrew Miano for their production company Depth of Field. In September 2021, Leslie Bibb and Kim Cattrall joined the lead cast. In November 2021, Brett Dier, Anders Holm, and David Rasche joined the cast.

Principal photography began on September 21, 2021, in Mobile, Alabama, and lasted for one month.

Release
The film is scheduled to be released by Lionsgate on May 26, 2023.

References

External links
 

American comedy films
American films based on actual events
Films about marriage
Films about vacationing
Films shot in Mobile, Alabama
Lionsgate films
Upcoming English-language films
Upcoming films
Films about father–son relationships
Films about families